Sporting-Sails is an outdoor product company specializing in equipment lines catered towards skateboarders, mountaineers, skiers, longboarders, snowboarders, surfers, and endurance athletes. Sporting-Sails is headquartered in Mill Valley, California.
The company is a member of One Percent for the Planet international organization, founded by Yvon Chouinard.  At least one percent of sales are donated to non-profit, non-governmental social welfare programs such as Surfrider Foundation and Save the Waves Coalition.

References

External links
 Official website

Retail companies of the United States